Murray John Cowper (born 25 October 1960) is an Australian politician, having served in the Western Australian Legislative Assembly from 2005 to 2017 as the Liberal member for Murray-Wellington.

He was born in South Perth. He joined the Western Australian Police in 1978, and served as a police officer in Broome, Fitzroy Crossing, Halls Creek, Dampier, Denmark and Australind. Along the way he achieved a Diploma in Search and Rescue, and a Diploma of Business Management, and ran a business with his wife.

He was elected to the seat of Murray at the 2005 election, succeeding John Bradshaw. The seat was renamed Murray-Wellington at the 2008 election. He was appointed to the Barnett Ministry as a parliamentary secretary.

References

1960 births
Living people
Members of the Western Australian Legislative Assembly
Liberal Party of Australia members of the Parliament of Western Australia
Politicians from Perth, Western Australia
21st-century Australian politicians